Sheykh Amr (also Romanized as Sheykh ʿAmr) is a village in Senderk Rural District, Senderk District, Minab County, Hormozgan Province, Iran. At the 2006 census, its population was 66, in 14 families.

References 

Populated places in Minab County